The Salvajina Dam and hydroelectric plant are located in the Cauca River, corregimiento Buenos Aires, municipality Suarez, department Cauca in the southwest of Colombia.

The dam was finished in September 1985 and has a power station with a  installed capacity. The purpose of the dam is flood control, electricity production, and drinking water supply for the city of Cali.

Operators and owners
The regulation of water-quantities released with respect to the prevention of floods is managed by the Corporación autónoma regional del Valle del Cauca, CVC, which in case of disagreement has  priority of decision. EPSA (Empresa de energía del Pacífico) has owned and operated the dam since shared by Colener S.A.S., Inversiones Argos S.A. y Banco de Inversión Bancolombia S.A

Design
An intake tower conducts the water towards three  Francis turbines which combine for a 270 MW installed capacity. The dam was designed by Ingetec S.A.

Criticism
There exist various accusations of national and international NGO's which mention violations of human rights as well as ecological debt in relation to the construction and management of the dam Salvajina.  There are various sources mentioning displacement of the population that lived in the zone of the reservoir which range from 3,000 to 6,000. people, According to Biodiversidad en América Latina y El Caribe, people evicted from the reservoir were not properly compensated. 
According to the Tribunal Permanente de los Pueblos, the Colombian military and illegal paramilitary forces were used in order to displace the population. and the Campaña Prohibido Olvidar cites that protesters were harassed. A lawyer who accompanied the protestors, Oscar Elías López, was shot dead in a café in Cali.

References

Literature 
 Corporación Autónoma Regiónal del Valle del Cauca, CVC: Proyecto de Modelación del Río Cauca, Chapter 3.

Dams completed in 1985
Energy infrastructure completed in 1985
Dams in Colombia
Hydroelectric power stations in Colombia
Concrete-face rock-fill dams
Buildings and structures in Cauca Department